The IEEE International Conference on Robotics and Automation (ICRA) is an annual academic conference covering advances in robotics. It is one of the premier conferences in its field, alongside the International Conference on Intelligent Robots and Systems (IROS),  with an 'A' rating from the Australian Ranking of ICT Conferences obtained in 2010 and an 'A1' rating from the Brazilian ministry of education in 2012.

References

Robotics organizations